Spencer Wilton (born 1 February 1973) is a British equestrian.  He represented his country at the 2016 Summer Olympics.

Together with the British dressage team, he won silver medal at the 2016 Summer Olympics on his horse Super Nova II.

International Championship Results

References

External links 
 Official website by Spencer Wilton

1973 births
Living people
British male equestrians
British dressage riders
Equestrians at the 2016 Summer Olympics
Olympic equestrians of Great Britain
Gay sportsmen
Olympic medalists in equestrian
Medalists at the 2016 Summer Olympics
Olympic silver medallists for Great Britain
English LGBT sportspeople
LGBT equestrians